The Henderson Kids is an Australian television series made by Crawford Productions for Network Ten between 1985 and 1987. It was created and storylined by Roger Moulton, who also wrote 5 episodes in the first series and 2 episodes in the second series.

Synopsis
The series follows teenage siblings Steve (Paul Smith) and Tamara (Nadine Garner). They are forced to leave the city and move to the country to live with their uncle Mike (Nicholas Eadie) after their mother Alice (Diane Craig) is hit by a truck and killed. Mike is a police officer in the fictional town of Haven Bay.

The Henderson kids make a new life in Haven Bay and make friends with the local gang. They were Ted Morgan (Ben Mendelsohn), Colin "Cowboy" Clarke (Mark Hennessy), Charlotte "Char" Kernow (Kylie Minogue) and Brian "Brains" Buchanan (Bradley Kilpatrick).

Steve and Tamara defend the family land, Hendersons' Point, against the schemes of ruthless businessman Ashley Wheeler (Peter Whitford). To compound matters, Steve falls in love with Wheeler's daughter Sylvia (Annie Jones).

Guest stars
Several well-known actors played guest roles in the series. They included Tottie Goldsmith, Kevin Harrington, Peter O'Brien, Stefan Dennis, and Jane Hall who, like Minogue, Kilpatrick and Jones, went on to appear in Neighbours. Antoinette Byron also had a role in the series.

Filming
The Haven Bay set footage was filmed in Birregurra, Victoria.

Series two
A second series (called The Henderson Kids II), set in the fictional bayside suburb of Westport followed in 1987. This had Steve and Tamara living in the city again, with their father Walter "Wal" Mullens (Michael Aitkens). They had a new gang of friends, including Vincent "Vinnie" Cerantonio (Alex Papps) as the leader of the Brown Street Boys (a gang of local high school kids on BMX bikes), twins Carol (Anita Cerdic) and Marty Summers (Nathan Croft), and Brian "Brains" Buchanan and Trevor Cathcart (Nicholas Creed), both holdovers from the original series.

Other central characters were the Henderson's next door neighbours Helen Marshall (Louise Howitt) and her 9-year-old daughter Sally (Marieke Hardy), their dad's shady business partner Harry (Ross Thompson) and his henchman Spider (John Jacobs), Sgt. Javorsky (Doug Bowles) of the Victorian police, Brown Street Boy Mick Dalton (Paul Hall) and the Westport High School 'snob' Miranda Kilsyth (Elizabeth Rule).

The Westport footage was filmed in Williamstown, Melbourne.

Awards 
Actress Nadine Garner won a Logie Award in 1985, and a Television Society of Australia Penguin Award (1987) for her portrayal of Tamara ("Tam") Henderson.

DVD releases
A total of 24 episodes were produced. In 2007 Madman Entertainment released two 3-DVD sets of the series: The Henderson Kids (series one) and The Henderson Kids II. The DVD extras are a 13-minute TV promo for series 1 on the first The Henderson Kids DVD set and a short "goof reel" from series two on the DVD set The Henderson Kids II.

International broadcasts
Both series were screened in the UK during 1989 on Channel 4. It was also screened in Poland.}

The whole series was screened in New Zealand on TVNZ.

The series aired Sunday evenings at 7:30 pm on GBC TV in Gibraltar where the series found much success, becoming the topic of conversation every Monday morning in schools.

It also aired in Greece under the title The Henderson Legacy on the state TV channel, ERT2.

References

External links
 
 
 The Henderson Kids at the National Film and Sound Archive

Australian drama television series
Australian children's television series
Network 10 original programming
Television series by Crawford Productions
Television shows set in Victoria (Australia)
1985 Australian television series debuts
1987 Australian television series endings
English-language television shows
Television series about siblings
Television series about teenagers